The Football League play-offs for the 2004–05 season were held in May 2005, with the finals taking place at Millennium Stadium in Cardiff. The play-off semi-finals were played over two legs and were contested by the teams who finished in 3rd, 4th, 5th and 6th place in the Football League Championship and League One and the 4th, 5th, 6th and 7th placed teams in the League Two table. The winners of the semi-finals progressed to the finals, with the winner of the matches gaining promotion for the following season.

Background
The Football League play-offs have been held every year since 1987. They take place for each division following the conclusion of the regular season and are contested by the four clubs finishing below the automatic promotion places.

In the Championship, Ipswich Town, who were aiming to return to the top flight for the first time since 2002, finished 2 points behind second placed Wigan Athletic, who in turn finished 7 points behind champions Sunderland, who returned to the top flight at the second attempt after relegation from the Premier League in 2003. Derby County who were also relegated along with Ipswich from the top flight in 2002, finished in fourth place in the table. Preston North End who have not been in the top flight since 1961, finished in fifth place. West Ham United finished 2 points behind Preston North End and were looking for a place back in the Premiership after 2 seasons outside the top division.

Championship

Semi-finals
First leg

Second leg

West Ham United won 4–2 on aggregate.

Preston North End won 2–0 on aggregate.

Final

League One

Semi-finals
First leg

Second leg

Sheffield Wednesday won 3–1 on aggregate.

Tranmere Rovers 2–2 Hartlepool United on aggregate. Hartlepool United won 6–5 on penalties.

Final

League Two

Semi-finals
First leg

Second leg

Lincoln City won 2–1 on aggregate.

Southend United won 1–0 on aggregate.

Final

External links
Football League website

 
Play
English Football League play-offs
May 2005 sports events in the United Kingdom